Polygonum achoreum, common names Blake's knotweed, leathery knotweed or striate knotweed, is a North American species of plants in the buckwheat family. It is widespread across much of Canada and the northern United States.

References

External links
photo of herbarium specimen at Missouri Botanical Garden, collected in Missouri in 1993

achoreum
Flora of Canada
Flora of the United States
Plants described in 1917